Luigi Frisoni (1760 – 10 January 1811) was an Italian painter, born in Verona. He initially apprenticed with Antonio Pachera. He taught in the local academy of painters.

Sources

1760 births
1811 deaths
Painters from Verona
18th-century Italian painters
Italian male painters
19th-century Italian painters
19th-century Italian male artists
18th-century Italian male artists